Nelly Wies-Weyrich (10 May 1933 – 5 July 2019) was a Luxembourgian archer. She was born in Luxembourg, and represented the club Flèche d'Or. She competed in archery at the 1972 Summer Olympics in Munich, where she placed 24th in the women's individual contest.

References

External links

1933 births
2019 deaths
Sportspeople from Luxembourg City
Luxembourgian female archers
Olympic archers of Luxembourg
Archers at the 1972 Summer Olympics